The 1998 Molson Indy Vancouver was the fifteenth round of the 1998 CART FedEx Champ Car World Series season, held on September 6, 1998, at Concord Pacific Place in Vancouver, British Columbia, Canada. Dario Franchitti took his second consecutive win at this race, after passing Michael Andretti for the lead with seven laps left. In doing so, Franchitti became the first driver to win a race from pole for over a year.

Building an insurmountable lead in the championship standings, Alex Zanardi's 4th-place finish in this race clinched the 1998 CART title with still four races remaining.

This marks the final career podium for Scott Pruett in CART.

Classification

Race

Caution flags

Lap Leaders

Point standings after race

References 

Indy Vancouver
Molson Indy Vancouver
Molson Indy Vancouver
1998 in British Columbia